Over It is the debut studio album by American singer Summer Walker. It was released on October 4, 2019, by LVRN and Interscope. It spawned the singles "Playing Games", "Stretch You Out" and "Come Thru". It also features the remix of Walker's "Girls Need Love" featuring Drake. It also features collaborations with Bryson Tiller, Usher, 6lack, PartyNextDoor, A Boogie wit da Hoodie and Jhené Aiko. Most of the album was produced by Walker's then-boyfriend, London on da Track. Walker's First and Last Tour supported the album, starting October 25, 2019.

Promotion
An "old school" commercial was released via Walker's YouTube channel on September 30 to promote the album, which was compared to infomercials for R&B albums from the 1990s. Few days before the actual album release, Walker promoted the album by putting various payphone in various cities painted in the theme of the album. A phone number was to be dialed to listen to the album few days before. After the album's release, Walker premiered a special on Beats 1 guest starring Ari Lennox, as part of their R&B Now series.

Critical reception 

Over It was met with critical acclaim upon release. At Metacritic, which assigns a normalized rating out of 100 to reviews from mainstream publications, the album received an average score of 86, based on 6 reviews, indicating "universal acclaim."

Accolades of Over it
The album won best album at the 2020 Soul Train Music Awards and was the most streamed album by a female artist on Apple Music in 2020.

Commercial performance
Over It debuted at number two on the US Billboard 200 with 134,000 album-equivalent units in its first week. Its debut week marked the largest streaming week for an R&B album by a female artist, in terms of on-demand audio streams. It went on to spend more than 100 weeks on Billboard 200, ranking as the second most successful R&B album of 2020 The album also topped the R&B Albums chart for 14 nonconsecutive weeks and as of July 2020, has yet to chart below number seven. On May 7, 2020, the album was certified platinum by the Recording Industry Association of America (RIAA) for combined sales and album-equivalent units over 1,000,000 units in the United States. As of November 2021, Over It had earned 2.500.000 equivalent copies in the U.S.

Track listing

Notes
  indicates a co-producer
  indicates an additional producer
  indicates a vocal producer
  "Body" contains a sample from "Get It Together", written by Donnell Jones and performed by 702.
  "Playing Games" interpolates "Say My Name", written by LaShawn Daniels, Rodney Jerkins, Fred Jerkins III, Beyoncé Knowles, LeToya Luckett, LaTavia Roberson, and Kelly Rowland, and performed by Destiny's Child
 "Drunk Dialing...LODT" interpolates "Cause I Love You", written by Lenny Williams and Michael Bennett and performed by Lenny Williams
  "Come Thru" contains samples from "You Make Me Wanna...", written by Usher Raymond IV, Jermaine Dupri, and Manuel Seal, and performed by Usher

Personnel
Credits adapted from Tidal.

Musicians

 Summer Walker – vocals
 Aubrey Robinson – keyboards 
 Usher – vocals 
 Khalid – vocals 
 Lee Stashenko – guitar 
 Chris Brown – vocals 
 PartyNextDoor – rap vocals 
 A Boogie wit da Hoodie – rap vocals 
 Scott Storch – keyboards 
 Jhené Aiko – vocals 
 Stevie J – bass and keyboards 

Technical

 Nicolas De Porcel – mastering engineer
 Cyrus "NOIS" Taghipour – mixer 
 Derek "MixedByAli" Ali – mixer 
 Jaycen Joshua – mixer 
 Summer Walker – recording engineer
 Kendall Roark Bailey – recording engineer 
 Ben Chang – recording engineer 
 Archer – recording engineer 
 Ben Chang – vocal producer 
 Ashley Jacobson – assistant recording engineer

Charts

Weekly charts

Year-end charts

Certifications

References

2019 debut albums
Summer Walker albums
Albums produced by Scott Storch
Albums produced by Stevie J
Albums produced by London on da Track
Interscope Records albums